Saber Chebana (born March 17, 1983 in Aïn M'lila) is an Algerian footballer. He currently plays for CA Batna in the Algerian Ligue Professionnelle 1.

Club career
In 2010, Chebana helped CA Batna reach the final of the 2009–10 Algerian Cup for the first time in the club's history. In the final against ES Sétif, Chebana started the game but scored an own goal in the 68th minute as CA Batna lost 3-0.

References

External links
 DZFoot Profile

1983 births
Living people
Algerian footballers
Algerian Ligue 2 players
CA Batna players
People from Aïn M'lila
USM Bel Abbès players
Association football defenders
AS Aïn M'lila players
21st-century Algerian people